Armori is a town and municipal council in the Gadchiroli district in the Indian state of Maharashtra. It is connected with the National Highway NH-353C.

It is located on the left of the Wainganga River, a tributary of the Pranahita River which meets the Godavari River.

Geography
It has an average elevation of 199 metres (676 feet).

It is part of Desaiganj subdivision of Gadchiroli district along with the tehsils Desaiganj, Kurkheda and Korchi.

Demographics  
As per Indian governmanet census of 2011, the population was 97097.

Transport

Road
Armori is well connected to major industrial and commercial places by road.  It is about 140 km from the city of Nagpur and about 36 km from district headquarters, Gadchiroli.  The Maharashtra State Road Transport Corporation (MSRTC) runs buses connecting Gadchiroli to Nagpur via Armori, Brahmpuri, Nagbhid, Umrer with a frequency of about 45 min.

Rail
Nearest railway station is Wadsa (Desaiganj) which is 18 km from Armori town.  The other nearby railway stations are Brahmpuri (21 km), Nagpur (140 km).
Railway ministry proposed new rail line from Wadsa (Desaiganj) to Gadchiroli via Armori.

Air
Nearest airport is Dr. Babasaheb Ambedkar International Airport, Nagpur which is about 130 km from the town of Armori.

See also
 Armori Municipal Council

References 

2.

Cities and towns in Gadchiroli district
Talukas in Maharashtra